Jowr Gavaber or Jowrgavaber may refer to:
 Jowr Gavaber, Amlash